The Oregon Department of Forestry (ODF) is the agency of the government of the U.S. state of Oregon which performs a wide variety of functions relating to the management, regulation and protection of both public and private forest lands in the state.  It was established in 1911 with the creation of the State Board of Forestry, its governing board, and the office of State Forester, appointed by that Board.  It has the broad mandate of the State Forester's charge to "act on all matters pertaining to forestry."  Specific activities of the department include forest fire prevention and protection; regulation of forest practices and promotion of forest stewardship; implementation of the Oregon Plan for Salmon and Watersheds; forest pest and disease detection and control; management of state-owned forestlands; nursery operation; forestry assistance to private woodland owners; forest resource research and planning; and community and urban forestry assistance.

See also
List of Oregon state forests
Oregon Department of State Lands

References

External links
 Official website

Forestry, Oregon Department of
State forestry agencies in the United States
Government agencies established in 1911
1911 establishments in Oregon